Silent Witness is a British crime drama television series produced by the BBC, which focuses on a team of forensic pathology experts and their investigations into various crimes. First broadcast in 1996, the series was created by Nigel McCrery, a former murder squad detective based in Nottingham. Twenty-six series of Silent Witness have been broadcast since 1996.

Amanda Burton starred as primary character Dr. Sam Ryan before leaving the show during the eighth series. Since her departure the series has featured an ensemble cast, which initially consisted of William Gaminara, Tom Ward and Emilia Fox, and later on David Caves, Liz Carr and Richard Lintern alongside Emilia Fox. At the end of series 23 Carr and Lintern both departed. The cast was joined by Genesis Lynea from series 24, who departed at the end of series 25. Series 26 saw Aki Omoshaybi, Rhiannon May and Alistair Michael join the regular cast.

The programme is broadcast in more than 235 territories, including ABC in Australia, Showcase and the Knowledge Network in Canada, KRO in the Netherlands, TV One and Prime in New Zealand, BBC First in South Africa and BBC America in the United States. Silent Witness continues to achieve good audience ratings in the UK. In 2011, for example, Series 14 attracted an average audience of nine million viewers.

Background
The main character in the original series was based on Professor Helen Whitwell, a forensic pathologist based in Sheffield, who McCrery had known while serving as a police officer. The programme followed the activities of pathologist Sam Ryan, played by Amanda Burton, until she departed early in the eighth series.

There was a succession of regular supporting characters, changing almost every series, but Dr Leo Dalton (William Gaminara) and Dr Harry Cunningham (Tom Ward), who were introduced in the sixth series, continued as lead characters following Ryan's departure, with Dalton replacing her as professor.

A new character, Dr Nikki Alexander (Emilia Fox), was introduced in mid-series eight, based on Dr Brooke Magnanti, a forensic scientist based in Sheffield. While working as a forensic anthropologist, she appropriates facilities and software in the pathology department to analyse an Iron Age find, with the belated, bemused and begrudging approval of Dalton. Dr Alexander is able to assist in a set of cases being investigated by the team, as it turns out she has "worked in forensic pathology in Johannesburg for six months" and is certified by the Home Office to practise. She eventually overcomes Leo's reluctance and, with Harry's support, is offered and accepts a position on the team.

Before the 16th series begins, Harry has left to accept a position in New York City. He is succeeded by forensics expert Jack Hodgson (David Caves) and his assistant Clarissa Mullery (Liz Carr). At the climax of the 16th series, Leo is killed in an explosion. His replacement, Dr Thomas Chamberlain (Richard Lintern), is introduced at the start of the 17th series.

Although the show focuses heavily on areas of pathology, the police also have a presence in each case. During later series of the show, detectives and investigators tend to differ from episode to episode, with guest artists appearing in these roles. However, during the early years of the show several characters appeared regularly to investigate each case.

The first three series were set in Cambridge. This changed to London from the start of the fourth series, following Sam as she took up an academic position in the Lyell Centre, the Pathology Department of UCL. The programme remained in an academic setting until the end of series 16 when the Lyell appeared to have become separated from the University and operated as a stand-alone institution.

Each series is typically made up of a series of two-part stories. The first nine series generally featured eight episodes (four two-part stories), except that series 4 and 5 each featured just six episodes (three two-part stories); this was increased to ten episodes (five two-part stories) from the tenth series onwards, excepting series 12 and 15 which each featured 12 episodes (six two-part stories). The 25th series, broadcast in 2022, introduced a new format consisting of one story in six episodes.

In 1998, the writer John Milne received an Edgar Award from the Mystery Writers of America for the second series episode "Blood, Sweat and Tears". In the United States the series airs during 'Mystery Monday' on BBC America.

Music
The theme music from series 2 onwards is entitled Silencium and is performed by John Harle. The arrangement, for chamber orchestra and soprano saxophone solo, was first performed as part of the Canterbury Festival on 22 October 2011. The vocal section is performed by Sarah Leonard.

Critical review
An episode first broadcast in April 2012 attracted criticism for its violent and sadistic content. There were 632 complaints made about the fifteenth-series episode Redhill, written by Ed Whitmore, which included a scene depicting a sadistic sexual and murderous attack. The BBC was censured by the editorial committee of the BBC Trust, which said in its report:

The BBC had responded to the initial criticism of the episode by saying that it took its responsibility to its audience "extremely seriously" and always tried to "strike the right balance between compelling drama without being unnecessarily graphic". It said that "The final scene was not an attempt to gratuitously shock the audience;... We acknowledge that certain scenes may have been challenging, but we filmed and presented them in such a way as to make sure that although as a viewer the implication was there, it was never actually shown."

The show has also been criticised by reviewer Michael Hogan. Reviewing the first episode of series 21, he asked in the UK's Daily Telegraph how it had become the world’s longest running crime drama, writing: "In place of convincing dialogue or emotion, they instead exchanged meaningful stares" and "The leading pair were so wooden, they made the bodies on the autopsy slab look lively."

Episodes

Characters

Overview

Main
Sam Ryan (Amanda Burton) – series 1–8, 25. Sam originally lived and worked in Cambridge, but moved to London at the end of series three after she was offered the job of professor at a university. Sam departed and returned home to Northern Ireland in the second episode of series eight, "A Time To Heal" in which a member of her family became a suspect in a murder case. 
Leo Dalton (William Gaminara) – series 6–16. Leo first appeared in the episode "The Fall Out", where he was a doctor. However, he was promoted to professor after former professor Sam Ryan left. In the episode "Ghosts", both his wife, Theresa, and his daughter, Cassie, are killed in a car accident. He began a relationship with fellow professor Janet Mander in "Death's Door", but ended their relationship in the episode "Redhill". Leo often took a strong opinion on cases and became emotionally involved. He died in the series 16 finale "Greater Love", when he sacrificed himself to save many others from a terrorist bomb explosion. He briefly appeared in a flashback in the last episode of series 20.
Harry Cunningham (Tom Ward) – series 6–15. Harry started out life as a junior doctor, who worked as an apprentice alongside Sam and Leo. However, he soon qualified as a pathologist, and has worked on equal footing with the team for a number of years. Harry was single, and lived alone, but has had several romantic relationships, including an ongoing 'will they-won't they' relationship with his colleague Nikki. Harry left the team to accept a professorship in New York at the end of series 15. As this was decided after filming was completed, and the stories were reordered, with "And Then I Fell in Love" airing last, where it was originally scheduled as the second episode, his departure was never on screen.
Nikki Alexander (Emilia Fox) – since series 8. Originally appearing in the episode "Nowhere Fast", Nikki was originally assigned to the Lyell Centre to defuse the tension between Harry and Leo after Sam's departure. However, Nikki soon became a permanent fixture within the team, and although she features more prominently in the series, holds a lower rank in pathology than Leo. Despite her native home being South Africa, Nikki regards the United Kingdom as her second home, as the reason for her departure from the country lies solely in the hands of her father, Victor, as explained in the episode "Double Dare". Nikki often flirted with colleague Harry, and even invited him to stay at her house after his flat blew up in an explosion. Nikki and Harry were in an ongoing 'will they-won't they' relationship until he left in series 15. As well as this, she developed a close relationship with Leo and looked up to him as a father figure. As Leo and Harry gradually left, Nikki has since become the series central character.
Jack Hodgson (David Caves) – since series 16. Before his arrival at the Lyell Centre, Jack was a forensic scientist for the police, working on regular murder investigations. However, when he is called out to the scene of a man's suspicious death in "Change", both Nikki and Leo spot his potential, and looking for a senior colleague to replace Harry, decide to offer Jack a job as the centre's forensic expert. Jack is close friends with colleague Clarissa Mullery, whom he invites to work with him at the Lyell Centre, much to Leo's surprise. In his spare time, Jack is a cage fighter, and splits his home life between forensic research and training for his next fight. 
Clarissa Mullery (Liz Carr) – series 16–23. Clarissa is Jack's personal lab assistant, who first appears in the episode "Change", when Jack invites her to work at the Lyell Centre with him, much to Leo's surprise. She is disabled by an unspecified condition and uses an electric wheelchair. She has a very cheeky side, making a quip at Leo after he fails to recognise her when she first arrives. Clarissa had clearly worked for Jack for a long period of time before his appointment at the Lyell Centre, but the exact period of time is unknown.
Thomas Chamberlain (Richard Lintern) – series 17–23. Thomas Chamberlain took over as head of the Lyell Centre from Leo who died at the end of series 16. He was an experienced forensic pathologist with a renowned reputation in toxicology and is described as charming, charismatic and socially shrewd. His first encounters with Jack, Nikki and Clarissa did not go well, but they gradually warmed to him. It is revealed in the last episode of his first series that his wife left him just before he started working at the Lyell Centre, taking their daughter with her. He died in the series 23 finale "The Greater Good" whilst investigating a nerve agent in the pathology suite of the Lyell Centre.
Simone Tyler (Genesis Lynea) – series 24-25. Simone is a meticulous forensic ecologist, who makes the jump from the museum to the mortuary at the Lyell Centre. Simone leaves at the end of season 25 to look after her nieces in Trinidad after learning about her estranged sister's death.

Recurring
Detective Chief Inspector Tom Adams (John McGlynn) – series 1. An investigator with the Cambridgeshire police force, who had an affair with Kerry Cox, before her death. 
Superintendent Helen Farmer (Clare Higgins) – series 1. A superintendent, and Tom Adams' boss and mentor, who accompanied him on investigating several cases during his time in the force.
Trevor Stewart (William Armstrong) – series 1–3. As well as being a pathologist in his own right, Trevor was Sam's business partner, owning half of the morgue and its facilities. Trevor decided to stay in Cambridge with his friends and family when Sam accepted the professorship position at a university in London and moved away at the end of series three.
Wyn Ryan (Ruth McCabe) – series 1–3. Professor Ryan's sister who moved to Cambridge with her mother some years before Sam's arrival, and one of the reasons Sam Ryan relocated. Initially their relationship was strained, but eventually the two moved in with one another and grew close. In the first episode of series 3, it is announced Wyn returned to Ireland. Wyn makes one appearance in season three to visit Sam and announce her upcoming wedding.
Superintendent Peter Ross (Mick Ford) – series 2. A superintendent, and an ex-boyfriend of Sam's, who believed in a strong relationship between the police and the pathology lab.
Detective Chief Inspector Michael Connor (Nick Reding) – Series 3–4. A detective chief inspector, and old friend of Sam's, whom she met during her junior years at university. He makes one appearance for the third story of the fourth season. 
Detective Sergeant Rob Bradley (Mark Letheren) – series 3. A detective sergeant, who as Connor's junior officer, accompanied him with the investigating in the cases which he was assigned to.
Fred Dale (Sam Parks) – series 1–3. Fred was Sam's main assistant during post mortems and on visits to crime scenes, often identifying DNA samples at the scene of the crime, and linking them to those responsible. He was also notable for not having many speaking lines, and regularly appearing without speaking. His fate at the end of series 3 was not revealed.
Detective Constable Kerry Cox (Ruth Gemmell) – series 1. A junior trainee detective who had an affair with Tom Adams, but was later killed in a freak accident in a hospital basement.
Detective Constable Marcia Evans (Janice Acquah) – series 1. A fellow junior trainee detective for the Cambridgeshire police force, who resigned after Kerry Cox's death.
Detective Chief Inspector Rachel Selway (Nicola Redmond) – Series 2. Tom Adams' replacement, following his resignation from the force. She joined the team alongside junior sergeant Tony Speed.
Detective Sergeant Tony Speed (Richard Huw) – series 2. A junior sergeant, who joined the team alongside his superior officer, Rachel Selway. He knew Peter Ross from a previous posting.
Janet Mander (Jaye Griffiths) – series 12–15. Janet is a psychological profiler who assists the police in cases of serial offences. She began a relationship with Leo in the episode "Death's Door", and they lived together as partners until Leo ended the relationship in "Redhill". She recurringly worked alongside the team to provide them with information in order to get an idea of the suspect they are looking for. Janet decided to move away from London after Leo ended their relationship.
Charlie Gibbs (Wunmi Mosaku) – series 13. A junior doctor and lab technician, who was appointed to work with the team by Professor Dalton.
Zak Khan (Arsher Ali) – series 14. A junior doctor who worked his forensic science apprenticeship with the team, to learn the ropes of the profession.
Ricky Ryan (Matthew Steer) – series 1. Wyn's son and Sam's nephew, who regularly got into trouble and was expelled from school for very poor behaviour.
Rosemary Mason (Jane Hazlegrove) – series 6–7. The main receptionist at the Lyell Centre, before the change in focus from university department to purely commercial pathology.
Max Thorndyke (Daniel Weyman) – series 20–22 Max is Clarissa's husband, a forensic data analyst originally called in by the Lyell team to help solve a case in series 20 but returning in 2 further episodes in series 21.
Adam Yuen (Jason Wong) – series 24. Adam is a confident, bright and keen pathologist who joins Nikki and Jack at the Lyell Centre. He dies midway through series 24, after being hit by a car, whilst investigating a suspect.

Guest appearances
A number of notable actors have made appearances in the show, including Shaun Dooley, John McEnery, Anastasia Hille, Nikki Amuka-Bird, Jack Bandeira,Phil Davis, Deborah Findlay, Duncan Preston, Emily Mortimer, Philip Glenister, Ken Stott, Brendan Coyle, Colin Salmon, Idris Elba, Roberta Taylor, Adrian Lester, Joe Absolom, Kevin Doyle, Nicholas Hoult, Adam James, Jesse Birdsall, Lesley Manville, Josette Simon, Neil Stuke, Stuart McQuarrie, Paul Copley, Robert Pugh, Melanie Hill, Chris Walker, Jack Dee, Christopher Colquhoun, Ace Bhatti, Richard Todd, Andrew Sachs, Suzanne Bertish, Neil Maskell, Stephen Moore, Anthony Head, Mel Martin, Sean Chapman, Bjørn Floberg, Marian McLoughlin, Angela Bruce, Richard Graham, Prunella Scales, Matthew Marsh, Philip Jackson, Paterson Joseph, Lia Williams, Shaun Dooley, Christopher Fulford, Ben Crompton, Nitin Ganatra, Stuart Graham, Russell Tovey, Neil Jackson, Ron Donachie, Benedict Cumberbatch, Chiké Okonkwo, Kellie Bright, Tim Healy, Esther Hall, Michael Nardone, Jack Sheperd, Robert Cavanah, Deborah Findlay, Roshan Seth, Ashley Jensen, Dorian Healy, Cal MacAninch, Shelley King, Annabelle Apsion, Eva Birthistle, Don Gilét, Jude Akuwudike, Jaye Griffiths, John Bowe, Hilton Mcrae, Stephen Walters, Daniel Casey, Caroline Lee-Johnson, Peter Howell, James Hillier, Sorcha Cusack, James Laurenson, Daragh O'Malley,  Kathy Kiera Clarke, Anton Lesser, Tom Wu, Peter Wight, Kate Fleetwood, David Harewood, Anastasia Hille, James Wilby, Ramon Tikaram, Richard Harrington, and Julia Ford.

Home media

Australia
In Australia (Region 4), series 1 through 23 have been released on DVD through Roadshow Entertainment, starting with series 1 on 7 September 2006 through to series 21 on 28 May 2018. Universal then took over the releases beginning with series 22 on 20 November 2019, and have re-released some earlier seasons this time as individual seasons rather than 2 season editions.

United Kingdom
As of June 2022, the first 24 series have been released on DVD, whilst all episodes from all 25 series have been made available on the BBC iPlayer.

Novels
During the early years of the show, series creator McCrery wrote and published four tie-in novels relating to the series, following Sam Ryan (Amanda Burton), Trevor Stewart (William Armstrong) and Superintendent Tom Adams (John McGlynn), and brand new character DS Stanley Sharman, with Burton generally appearing on the front cover of each novel. A fifth novel, "In Search of Evil", was due to be released in 2003, but its publication was cancelled.

References

External links

1996 British television series debuts
1990s British crime drama television series
1990s British mystery television series
2000s British crime drama television series
2000s British mystery television series
2010s British crime drama television series
2010s British mystery television series
2020s British crime drama television series
2020s British mystery television series
BBC crime television shows
BBC high definition shows
BBC television dramas
Edgar Award-winning works
English-language television shows
Television shows about death
Television shows set in the United Kingdom
British crime television series
Television series by BBC Studios